Cathkin Park is a municipal park in Glasgow, Scotland. The park is maintained by the city's parks department, and it is a public place where football is still played. The park contains the site of the second Hampden Park, previously home to the football clubs Queen's Park (from 1884 to 1903) and Third Lanark (from 1903 to 1967). The site of the original Hampden Park is just to the west.

Football ground
The park formerly contained a football stadium, which had played host to organised football since 1884. It was originally known as Hampden Park (the second by that name, succeeding the original Hampden Park) and was rented by Queen's Park between 1884 and 1903; the first match was on 18 October 1884, a goalless draw against Dumbarton watched by 7,000. As Hampden Park, the ground hosted nine Scottish Cup finals (plus two replays) between 1885 and 1899, as well as several finals of the Glasgow Cup and Glasgow Merchants Charity Cup, the 'unofficial World Championship' club challenge match in 1888, and six Scotland international fixtures between 1885 and 1890. A single rugby union international (which usually took place in Edinburgh) was played there: Scotland defeated England in the 1896 Home Nations Championship in front of 20,000 spectators.

When Queen's Park decided to build their own stadium and moved to the third (and current) Hampden Park on open ground about  further south, Third Lanark took over the lease. Third Lanark failed to agree a fee with Queen's Park for the pavilion and other fittings (which they owned, while the ground itself was leased), resulting in the departing club removing the existing structures for use at their new stadium and the new occupiers having to rebuild virtually from scratch. During the first season following the move (1903–04, in which they finished as champions), Third Lanark played several of their home matches at the new Hampden while work was carried out on Cathkin Park. No major finals were played at this version of the ground, but it became the regular home of the Home Scots v Anglo-Scots international trial match which ran from the 1890s to the 1920s.

Third Lanark's last match at Cathkin took place on 25 April 1967, when they played out a 3–3 draw against Queen of the South. Jimmy Davidson scored one goal for Queens and Brian McMurdo two, including the last senior football goal at the park (the Thirds goals came from Kinnaird with two goals and McLaughlan with the other). A Glasgow Challenge Cup Final was played at Cathkin on 13 May 1967 between two Junior sides, Cambuslang Rangers and Rutherglen Glencairn (Cambuslang winning 2–0); this was the final football match played at Cathkin before Third Lanark folded later that year. The final goal to be scored at Cathkin came from Cambuslang Rangers forward Peter Coleman after 17 minutes.

The stadium subsequently fell into disrepair and most of the fabric was gradually removed. The remains of the terraces from three sides of the ground can be seen in the park. However, a reformed Third Lanark team, which plays in the Greater Glasgow Amateur League, currently plays in the park, as do Hampden AFC  and boys team the Jimmy Johnstone Academy.

In 2017, Third Lanark A.F.C. announced a £5 million plan to return to Cathkin and redevelop the ground, with an all-weather pitch, a 2000-seat stand, floodlights and community facilities for football and cricket. In the meantime, the latest of several projects to carry out basic renovations on the remaining terracing and barriers by volunteers, including actor Simon Weir, took place in early 2019.

Gallery

References

External links
 
 
 Video of the remaining terraces, May 2011
The Hampden Collection, cultural preservation society

Football venues in Glasgow
Parks and commons in Glasgow
Queen's Park F.C.
Third Lanark A.C.
Scottish Football League venues
Scotland national football team venues
Sports venues completed in 1884
Govanhill and Crosshill